María Euridice Páramo Fonseca (born 1953 in Bogotá, Colombia) is a Colombian paleontologist and geologist. She has contributed to paleontology in Colombia in the fields of describing various Cretaceous reptiles, most notably the mosasaurs Eonatator and Yaguarasaurus, the ichthyosaurs Kyhytysuka and Stenorhynchosaurus, and the plesiosaur Leivanectes.

Biography 

In 1991, Páramo obtained her MSc. degree from the Universidad Nacional de Colombia with a thesis titled Posición Sistemática de un reptil marino con base en los restos fósiles encontrados en capas del Cretácico Superior en Yaguará, Huila and her PhD degree in 1997 from the Université de Poitiers with a thesis Les Vertébrés marins du Turonien de la Vallée Supérieure du Magdalena, Colombie, Systématique, Paléoécologie et Paléobiogéographie. With "Mention d’honneur avec félicitations" for doctoral thesis. María Páramo lectures and conducts research in the Department of Geosciences at the Universidad Nacional de Colombia in Bogotá since 2006. Páramo has helped establish a foundation for the preservation and rescue of fossils in the region of Colombia, along with other researchers and contributors.

Páramo, together with fellow paleontologist Fernando Etayo, collaborated in describing the first dinosaur fossil found in Colombia, Padillasaurus leivaensis from the Paja Formation, close to Villa de Leyva, Boyacá.

Other species described by Páramo are the mosasaur Eonatator coellensis from Coello, Tolima, the pliosaur Stenorhynchosaurus munozi, and ichthyosaur Platypterigius sachicarum from the Paja Formation, Platypterygius appendicular remains from Northern tip of South America, fossil fish species Bachea huilensis from the Villeta Group, and Gomphotheres from Pleistocene beds close to Cartagena. One of the most complete discoveries in South America, the mosasaur Yaguarasaurus columbianus from the La Frontera Formation, Huila, is mainly found in South America, but has been identified globally. Along with Fonsesca, in 2000, collected the tooth of mosasaur genus found in layers of the Turoniense of the Villeta Formation from "Mosasauroids from Colombia."

Páramo has published in Spanish, French and English.

Works 
This list is a selection.

Articles 
 2019 - A new late Aptian elasmosaurid from the Paja Formation, Villa de Leiva, Colombia
 2018 - Appendicular remains of an ophthalmosaurid ichthyosaur from the lower Barremian of Villa de Leiva, Colombia
 2016 - Stenorhynchosaurus munozi, gen. et sp. nov. a new pliosaurid from the Upper Barremian (Lower Cretaceous) of Villa de Leiva, Colombia, South America
 2013 - Eonatator coellensis nov. sp. (Squamata: Mosasauridae), a new species from the Upper Cretaceous of Colombia
 2012 - Mosasauroids from Colombia
 2007 - The first Late Pleistocene record of Kinosternon (Cryptodira:Kinosternidae) turtles for Northern South America, Pubenza locality, Colombia
 2001 - Los peces de la familia Pachyrhizodontidae (Teleostei) del Turoniano del Valle Superior del Magdalena, Colombia, dos nuevas especies
 2000 - Yaguarasaurus columbianus (Reptilia, Mosasauridae), a primitive mosasaur from the Turonian (Upper Cretaceous) of Colombia
 1998 - Platypterigius sachicarum (Reptilia, Ichtyosauria), nueva especie del Cretácico de Colombia
 1997 - Bachea huilensis nov. gen., nov. sp., premier Tselfatioidei (Teleostei) de Colombie

See also 
 Geology of the Altiplano Cundiboyacense
 Geology of the Eastern Hills of Bogotá
 Bogotá Formation
 Paja Formation
 La Frontera Formation
 Fernando Etayo

References

Notable works by Páramo

External links 
  Presentation by María Páramo

Living people
20th-century births
Year of birth missing (living people)
Colombian geologists
Colombian paleontologists
~
People from Bogotá
National University of Colombia alumni
University of Poitiers alumni
Women geologists
 
Colombian women biologists